Songdalen is a former municipality in the old Vest-Agder county, Norway. The municipality existed from 1964 until 2020 when it was merged with Søgne and Kristiansand municipalities to form a new, much larger Kristiansand municipality in what is now Agder county. It was located in the traditional district of Sørlandet, just outside of the city of Kristiansand. The administrative centre of the municipality was the village of Nodeland. Other villages in the municipality included Brennåsen, Finsland, Kilen, Nodelandsheia, and Volleberg. The Sørlandsbanen railway line ran through the municipality, stopping at Nodeland Station. The European route E39 highway also ran through the southern part of the municipality.

Prior to its dissolution in 2020, the  municipality is the 323rd largest by area out of the 422 municipalities in Norway. Songdalen is the 161st most populous municipality in Norway with a population of 6,568.

General information

Songdalen was a relatively new municipality. During the 1960s, there were many municipal mergers across Norway due to the work of the Schei Committee. On 1 January 1964, the municipality of Greipstad (population: 2,061), most of the municipality of Finsland (population: 797) except for the Kleveland bru area, and the Eikeland area of Øvrebø (population: 39) were all merged to form the new municipality of Songdalen. On 1 January 1978, a small area of Vennesla municipality (population: 10) was transferred to Songdalen. Then on 1 January 1984, the unpopulated Hauglandsvatnet area was transferred from Vennesla to Songdalen.

On 1 January 2020, the three neighboring municipalities of Kristiansand, Songdalen, and Søgne merged to form one large municipality called Kristiansand.

Name
The municipality was named Songdalen. The Old Norse form of the name is uncertain. The first element is related to the river name Sygna (see Søgne), but the exact form and meaning is unknown. The last element is the finite form of dal which means "valley" or "dale".

Coat of arms
The coat of arms was granted on 20 December 1985 and they were in use until the municipality was dissolved on 1 January 2020. The official blazon is "Vert, three oak leaves in pall and three acorns in pall inverted stems conjoined Or". This means the arms have a green field (background) and the charge is three conjoined oak leaves with three acorns. The charge has a tincture of Or which means it is commonly colored yellow, but if it is made out of metal, then gold is used. The green color in the field and the oak leaf and acorn design symbolize the importance of the abundant oak forests in the municipality. There are three leaves/acorns to represent each of the three former municipalities of Greipstad, Finsland, and Øvrebø which were merged to form the municipality of Songdalen in 1964. The arms were designed by Nils Th. Finstad.

Churches
The Church of Norway has two parishes within the municipality of Songdalen. It is part of the Mandal prosti (deanery) in the Diocese of Agder og Telemark.

Geography
Songdalen was an inland municipality, the municipalities of Kristiansand and Vennesla were located to the east, Marnardal to the west, and Søgne to the south. Songdalen's administrative centre, Nodeland, is a short 10-minute drive from the center of the city of Kristiansand.

The landscape of the municipality is heavily shaped by the last ice age. The river Songdalselva flows through the valley that makes up the southern part of the municipality. It is recognized for fishing, canoeing, and other recreational opportunities.

The climate changes correspondingly, from a coastal climate in the south to a more inland type climate in the north.

The forests are mixed deciduous and evergreen (heavily forested with oak and pine), with the ratio of pine woods increasing towards the north of the municipality. Moose and beaver are common in the area.

Climate

Government
All municipalities in Norway, including Songdalen, are responsible for primary education (through 10th grade), outpatient health services, senior citizen services, unemployment and other social services, zoning, economic development, and municipal roads.  The municipality was governed by a municipal council of elected representatives, which in turn elected a mayor.  The municipality fell under the Kristiansand District Court and the Agder Court of Appeal.

Municipal council
The municipal council  of Songdalen was made up of 25 representatives that were elected to four year terms.  The party breakdown of the final municipal council was as follows:

History

In 1964, Finsland and Greipstad municipalities, along with the Eikeland area of neighboring Øvrebø, were merged to form Songdalen municipality.

Greipstad is mentioned in written sources as early as 1344. Through the Middle Ages records indicate that Greipstad, a small farm community with 34 farms, was continuously inhabited. Greipstad became an independent municipality in 1913; split off from the municipality of Søgne.

Finsland, which lies further from the coast, has few preserved written records, but records have indications of farms there in the year 1000.

The highway was built in the 1790s and the section exists today in much the same way as it did for ordinary traffic in 1881.

The fortifications at Rossevann were built in 1916-1917 for the Stavanger Battalion. The municipality also has visible evidence of World War II fortifications.

References

External links
Municipal fact sheet from Statistics Norway 

Welcome to Songdalen - Tourist information

 
Kristiansand region
Former municipalities of Norway
1964 establishments in Norway
2020 disestablishments in Norway